Jane Foster is a superhero appearing in American comic books published by Marvel Comics. The character was introduced as a love interest of the superhero Thor Odinson until becoming a superhero in her own right. Created by writers Stan Lee and Larry Lieber, and artist Jack Kirby, the character first appeared in Journey into Mystery #84 (September 1962). 

For many years, Foster was a nurse, employed by Dr. Donald Blake, Thor's first mortal host, before becoming a doctor herself. Foster is later revealed to be deemed worthy to wield Thor's hammer Mjolnir when the former is no longer able. During this period, she adopts the mantle of Thor, and joins the Avengers. Foster's stint as Thor ends with the character sacrificing her life and the mantle reverting to the original Thor. After Brunnhilde and the rest of the Valkyrior are killed during "The War of the Realms" storyline, Foster takes up the mantle of Valkyrie. The character has also appeared in various media adaptations of Thor. 

Jane Foster has been described as one of Marvel's most notable and powerful female heroes.

Since 2011, Natalie Portman has portrayed Jane Foster in the Marvel Cinematic Universe.

Publication history

Jane Foster first appeared in Journey into Mystery #84 (September 1962), and was created by plotter Stan Lee, scripter Larry Lieber and penciler Jack Kirby. Named "Jane Nelson" in her first two appearances, she went on to appear as the love interest of Dr. Donald Blake, the secret identity of the Norse god superhero Thor, in nearly every issue through #136 (Jan. 1967) of the title, by then renamed Thor.

In October 2014, the fourth volume of Thor, writer Jason Aaron and artist Russell Dauterman in the first issue debuted a female character in the role of Thor after the classic hero is no longer able to wield Mjolnir. Aaron stated, "This is not She-Thor. This is not Lady Thor. This is not Thorita. This is Thor. This is the Thor of the Marvel Universe. But it’s unlike any Thor we’ve ever seen before." In 2015, this Thor joined the Avengers in All-New All-Different Avengers FCBD (May 2015), which takes place in the aftermath of the "Secret Wars" storyline. In Thor vol. 4 #8 (May 2015), the identity of the woman was revealed to be Jane Foster. Aaron said, "It grew out of the idea of the previous Thor becoming unworthy, which was something I was always building toward. I liked the idea of dealing with his worthiness and the idea of what it means for a god to be worthy in the Marvel universe. You know, the god of thunder waking up every morning and looking at the hammer and not knowing if he’s gonna be worthy to lift it. Then, of course, one day he should wake up and not be able to lift it. That opened the door for someone else to pick up the hammer and carry it around in his place. Really, the only character that was discussed was Jane." A second volume of The Mighty Thor by Aaron and Dauterman and again starring Jane Foster as Thor debuted as part of the All-New, All-Different Marvel initiative after the conclusion of "Secret Wars". The concept of Jane Foster gaining the powers of Thor had previously been explored in What If #10 (August 1978). Foster appeared in the 2015 original graphic novel Avengers: Rage of Ultron as a member of the Avengers.

Jane Foster reappears in the War of the Realms storyline before taking up the mantle as the new Valkyrie in a new ongoing series titled "Jane Foster: Valkyrie". The series was written by Aaron in collaboration with other authors. One of those authors, Torunn Grønbekk, wrote a new comic in 2022, "Jane Foster & The Mighty Thor".

Fictional character history

Early history
Jane Nelson, known by her more common name of Jane Foster, was a nurse for Dr. Donald Blake, eventually developing feelings for him and Thor, not knowing that they were one and the same. The love triangle went on for a while until Thor revealed his secret identity to Foster, which caused Odin to punish him though he was forgiven after saving Asgard, and in return Thor even took her to Asgard with him. There, Foster was briefly granted immortality and the power of gods, until she failed to pass the tests of courage set forth by Odin when she showed fear battling the monstrous Unknown. Odin then strips Foster of her new powers and returns her to Earth, with no memory of Thor or her time in Asgard, where she meets her new love Dr. Keith Kincaid, who resembles Blake. Meanwhile, in Asgard Odin reunites Thor with his childhood love, Sif.

Foster and Thor remain separated for some time until Thor learns Foster had been manipulated into attempting suicide by an entity known as Fear and rushes to her hospital bedside. Sif, seeing Thor still has feelings for Foster, saves Foster's life by merging their life-forces. They soon are separated and Foster is exiled to a pocket dimension. Thor and Sif eventually rescue Foster and return her to Earth, where she marries Dr. Keith Kincaid.

Physician
Foster appears again in the second Thor volume; now a doctor herself, she is in a position of authority over several New York paramedics, including Jake Olsen. Unbeknownst to her, Jake and Thor have become merged, which creates many conflicts. In one instance, Olsen ignores medical orders and utilizes Thor's (Blake's) knowledge to perform a complicated procedure on a critically ill man.

Later, Foster becomes involved in a police case against Olsen, who is accused of stealing drugs. She also examines Jack Monroe, who stated that he sought her out due to her familiarity with superhuman patients. She later informed Monroe that he was dying due to the effects of the Super-Soldier Serum he had ingested as a youth.

During the 2006 "Civil War" storyline Foster takes Captain America's side against the registration act and joins his resistance group, the Secret Avengers. She operates from SHIELD safe-house number 23. She is also seen in issue 4, helping to assist a beaten Spider-Man.

Return
Shortly after divorcing her husband and subsequently losing custody of her child, Jimmy Kincaid, Foster hears rumors of the return of Dr. Donald Blake and Thor. Blake soon visits Foster at her work in a New York City hospital in search of Sif, whose spirit Blake mistakenly thought had been reborn in Foster since their spirits had been merged once before. Foster and Blake go on a date after an initially turbulent reunion. Foster discovers that Sif's spirit had actually been reborn in the body of a dying elderly cancer patient that was under her care. She alerts Blake and Thor manages to restore Sif just before the patient dies. Foster then travels to Broxton, Oklahoma, the site of the resurrected Asgard, and opens a medical practice with Donald Blake.

Cancer and becoming Thor
Following the deaths of her ex-husband and son in a car accident, Foster is diagnosed with breast cancer, and accepts an invitation from Thor to represent Midgard in the Congress of the Worlds on Asgard. She undergoes therapy but refuses all magical treatments.

During the 2014 "Original Sin" storyline, Nick Fury whispers an, at the time, unrevealed secret to Thor that causes him to lose the ability to wield Mjolnir. Soon afterwards, an unidentified woman picks up the hammer, taking possession of Thor's power as the new Goddess of Thunder, and fights Malekith the Accursed, Dario Agger (the new Minotaur), and the Absorbing Man. Although Thor initially attempts to reclaim the hammer, he – referring to himself as 'Odinson' – relinquishes the name and role of Thor after witnessing her wield its power. Odinson suspects Foster as a possible candidate for his successor, but he soon dismisses her due to her weakened condition from chemotherapy.

Angered that someone else is wielding Mjolnir, Odin and his brother Cul, the God of Fear, send the Destroyer after the new Thor to retrieve the hammer, but Odinson and Freyja assemble an army of female superheroes to aid her. When the battle is over, Odinson asks Thor to reveal her face, but is interrupted by S.H.I.E.L.D. agent Roz Solomon, Odinson's last 'viable' suspect as the new Thor after all other possible candidates came to assist in the battle. Unbeknownst to Odinson, Mjolnir has given Jane the strength to fight as Thor while it is in her possession. However, Jane's use of Mjolnir has perpetuated her cancer as a result of the transformation process purging all toxins from her body, including the chemotherapy being used for her treatment, each time she transforms.

Secret Wars
During the 2015 "Secret Wars" storyline, Foster was a participant in the final battle between Earth-616 and Earth-1610 during its collision during the incursion event. She is one of the few survivors of the end of the extant Marvel Universe, boarding Reed Richards's "life raft". She and the other survivors are awakened eight years later, having been trapped in suspended animation. In the interim, Doctor Doom created a new universe, Battleworld, from the fragments of dead universes. Knowing the survivors represent the only hope of defeating Doom, Doctor Strange scatters Foster and the others to different parts of Battleworld. For this, Doom kills Strange and begins hunting the survivors. Foster infiltrated the Thor Corps, Doom's police force, and convinced a majority of them to revolt against Doom.

All-New All-Different Marvel
In the 2015–18 All-New All-Different Marvel branding, Foster remains in Asgardia as a representative of Midgard (Earth) in the Congress of Worlds, and as Thor, she remains a fugitive pursued by Cul. Odinson is considered missing. She became involved in the war between Svartalfheim, the realm of the Dark Elves, and Alfheim, the realm of the Light Elves and encountered several incarnations of Loki. After the elf races struck a deal by wedding their respective monarchs, Thor returned to Asgard to confront the power-mad Odin, who had Freyja on trial. Loki and Thor arrived at the point when The All-Mother was about to be placed on a verdict by Odin. The rebellious Asgardian warriors also made their way into the hall fighting Cul Borson's thunderguard. Thor and Odin got into a crunching battle that wandered across Saturn's moons while it was revealed that Loki was a spy for Freyja. Loki then stabs Freyja halting the battles at hand. Meanwhile, in a different location entirely, Odinson is held captive telepathically feeling the death of his mother. Later, after returning to Earth, Jane is taken into custody by two S.H.I.E.L.D. agents who suspected of her double life as Thor until she's bailed out by Agent Solomon. She goes to Switzerland where she meets Agent Solomon and accompanies her to the Southern Ocean to find a hidden station that belongs to Roxxon. They find the station underwater where Thor encounters Shingen Harada, the second Silver Samurai, who had invaded the station. After being defeated, Shingen escapes from the station, leaving Thor and Agent Solomon to drown. Thor manages to lift the station to the surface while Solomon interrogated the employees about the location of Dario Agger and his contingency plan known as the Agger Imperative. Upon entering Roxxon Corporation HQ, Thor battles the Mindless Ones and the B.E.R.S.E.R.K.E.R.S., a group of Hulk-like superhumans, while Solomon looked for Dario. During the fight, Thor is approached by S.H.I.E.L.D. who order her to surrender, apparently discovering her civilian identity. Upon holding off the S.H.I.E.L.D. squad, Thor finds Solomon wounded from her fight with Exterminatrix and attacks her and Minotaur with her lightning. When Exterminatrix was about to shoot at Dario with a golden bullet, Thor caught it in mid-air, only for her to get affected by the bullet's gold turning effect. When S.H.I.E.L.D. was about to arrest them, a portal appeared revealing Jane Foster coming to help Thor. While Jane removes the gold bullet from Thor, the Agger Imperative is activated causing the island where the building is to fall from the sky. While S.H.I.E.L.D. evacuates the building, Thor defeats Silver Samurai and Exterminatrix and destroys the island. While the villains are arrested, the two agents who tried to arrest Jane apologize to her and Thor. Thor then reveals to Solomon that the other Jane is an illusion created by Mjolnir and her secret identity as well. After promising to keep the secret safe, Solomon asks Jane about the hammer until Jane disappears when she grabs Mjolnir and gets struck by lightning.

All-New All-Different Avengers
Thor is also once again a member of the Avengers and appears in All-New All-Different Avengers. She appeared by chance in their encounter with Warbringer and subsequently agrees to help form a new official Avengers group. Her identity is unknown to her teammates until she is separated from the hammer when she is transferred a few days into the future by Kang the Conqueror, and Sam Wilson, the new Captain America, witnesses her as she reverts to Jane. He agrees to keep it secret, and offers her moral support during chemotherapy treatments.

While treating mystical tumors in his former patients created by Misery, a manifestation of his own darkness, Doctor Strange calls on Thor for assistance; fully aware of her true identity as Jane Foster, Strange guides Thor in performing the necessary operations to remove the tumors from his patients after they had defeated the manifestation of Misery itself.

Eventually, Jane's cancer reaches a point where she must confess her identity to Odinson and others, who force her to stay in a hospital under observation by Doctor Strange despite the threat of Mangog attacking Asgard, as Strange determines that one more transformation into Thor will kill Jane as the cancer spreads too far. When Mangog proves too powerful, Jane transforms into Thor and confronts him, sacrificing Mjolnir – and thus her life – by binding Mangog and Mjolnir together with Gleipnir, the chain used to trap Fenris the wolf, and hurling both into the Sun. Knowing that she will die once the enchantment that turns her into Thor wears off, Jane kisses Odinson for a final time before expiring. Consumed by grief of Jane's loss, Odinson works to revive her as she hesitates at the gates of Valhalla. Upon Jane gaining his respect, Odin channels the powers of the God Tempest and assists Odinson into resurrecting Jane. In the aftermath of Mangog's defeat, Mjolnir is destroyed, but it is discovered after Foster hands Odinson an uru shard that he is now capable of wielding the metal again. Jane convinces Odinson to reclaim his name and continue in the War Between the Realms as the true Thor while she resolves to focus on her chemotherapy.

Becoming a Valkyrie
When the "War of the Realms" comes to Earth, Jane assists in getting refugees to safety, with her chemotherapy successfully concluded and her hair now growing back. During the invasion she meets Valkyrie and Frigga, confirming that she was the Thor who defeated Mangog. When a new assault requires Odin and Frigga to retreat to Asgard with various Earth heroes, Frigga appoints Jane to act as All-Mother while she and Odin help to prepare the counter-attack to protect Earth. As the war continues, Brunnhilde and the rest of the Valkyrior are massacred by Malekith and his forces. Jane Foster later takes the broken hammer of the Earth-1610 Thor in order to help fight Malekith's forces. Acting as a Thor one last time, she joins Thor Odinson, young Thor, and future King Thor to rescue Odin and Frigga from Malekith. Jane Foster notices that the Earth-1610 Mjolnir is about to shatter from the battle, and she hurls it one last time at Laufey. Jane Foster bids farewell to the Earth-1610 Mjolnir as it returns to her, crumbling; however, its shards combine and merge into a golden bracelet that forms on her arm. Jane learns that this bracelet can now be anything that she needs. As she sees the sorrow in Thor mourning the Valkrior and his faith in Valhalla, Jane knows she needs to become a Valkyrie. Jane becomes the first in a new generation of Valkyries, armed with Undrajarn the All-Weapon, named so by the spirit of Brunnhilde as she and the Valkrior spirits rise from their bodies to find Valhalla. On her first major outing as the Valkyrie, Jane loses Dragonfang in a battle with the Fast Five when the sword is stolen by Bullseye. After Bullseye fatally wounds Heimdall, Jane accepts the need to move on from the past, sacrificing Dragonfang to defeat the assassin and then agreeing to take Heimdall somewhere other than Valhalla to give him a genuinely new experience.

Powers and abilities

Thor
When wielding Mjolnir, Foster gains all the powers of Thor, including the base Asgardian traits of superhuman strength, speed, stamina, and durability, as well as Thor's flight and control over lightning; though only a tiny portion of those powers.

Foster, however, demonstrates a form of control over Mjolnir that her predecessors lacked, such as changing its trajectory and velocity in mid-throw, and spinning it around her enemies to trap them, abilities neither Beta Ray Bill nor any of those aside from Jane had ever displayed.

Valkyrie
As Valkyrie, Jane Foster wields Undrajarn the All-Weapon, a weapon that can change its shape into any weapon of her will. These include a sword, an extendable mace, or even wings to fly. Jane Foster possesses various superhuman attributes due to her Asgardian physiology, grating her superhuman strength, speed, stamina, and durability, alongside new powers common among valkyries, such as mystical teleportation and death perception.

Cultural impact and legacy

Critical reception 
Chase Magnett of Comicbook.com called Jane Foster a "key hero in The Avengers and for Asgard," writing, "She has recreated the story of Dr. Donald Blake from the original comics and updated it for the modern day. The morals have remained the same though, focused on how an ordinary human can be empowered by their own virtue and accomplish incredible tasks. Jane Foster did just that and inspired fictional Marvel heroes as well as very real readers along the way." Thomas Bacon of Screen Rant described Jane Foster as "Marvel's best Thor to date," stating, "Right now, Jane Foster's death obscures the future of the Thor brand over in the comics. She has had a powerful impact, and has come to be loved by fans. [...] It's ironic; the death was always going to happen. But it was executed with so much style that it has had an impact Marvel could never have expected. Jane Foster has become their best Thor; it's just such a tragedy that it will be the death of her." Mayra Garcia of CBR.com referred to Jane Foster as one of Marvel's "strongest female gods," saying, "Even though her time as Thor was cut short due to her cancer, Jane showed great prowess in battle and also, an undeniable heroic streak. She showed her mighty power up until the moment she sacrificed herself to defeat Mangog, but even after death, Jane returned as a Valkyrie, proving that heroism goes beyond superpowers. Many fans are very excited to see her in Thor: Love And Thunder." Oliver Sava of The A.V. Club stated, "Jane Foster’s time as Thor is coming to an end, but she’s going out in a blaze of glory fit for a legendary superhero run. Writer Jason Aaron, artist Russell Dauterman, and colorist Matthew Wilson gave the Marvel Universe a thrilling, tragic hero in Foster, who has been battling cancer while fighting for the Nine Realms in a devastating war that has only intensified with each day. The effects of Jane’s chemotherapy are negated every time she transforms into Thor, and her human body is on the verge of death when the rest of the realms need her most. Jane’s journey as the god of thunder has been a highlight of superhero comics for the last few years, and this creative team made this heroine a major part of the Marvel’s line-up by consistently raising the stakes for both Jane and Thor."

Brian Truitt of USA Today asserted, "In Thor No. 8, out Wednesday and illustrated by Russell Dauterman, Dr. Jane Foster is revealed as the mysterious masked woman who has been swinging Mjolnir as Thor since the Dude Formerly Known as Thor — now just called the Odinson — was deemed unworthy. It's a big step in the evolution of the female character, according to Thor series writer Jason Aaron, but Jane's place as Marvel Comics' resident thunder goddess is just part of the current tale. [...] The response to the new female Thor, even when people didn't know who was under her mask, has been admittedly "overwhelming" for Aaron since she was announced on ABC's The View last July. But, he says he never thought it would be that big a deal in the first place." Rosie Knight of Nerdist asserted, "Thor has long been a staple of the House of Ideas. Though many have wielded the mystical hammer Mjolnir, it requires a lot to truly take on the mantle of Thor. In 2014’s Thor comic series, the “Goddess of Thunder” story arc by Jason Aaron, Russell Dauterman, and Matt Wilson introduced the world to an entirely new incarnation of the iconic character. Recasting Jane Foster as Thor was as stroke of genius, and brought a legion of new fans to the title." Eric Nierstedt of ComicsVerse wrote, "Escapism or not, comics have shown us the horrible truth of how much sickness and disease can affect even the strongest person. THOR is the best example of this in comics right now. Since Jane Foster (who was fighting cancer) picked up Mjolnir, we as readers have been treated to the classic godly and otherworldly thrills that only THOR can provide. We’ve also seen a sickly, dying woman sitting in a chair, having poison pumped into her body to kill the poison that’s already there. Worse, we see that same woman be a hero, only to learn that doing so is actually killing her faster." D.R. Medlen of The Mary Sue said, "Jane Foster is the one who Thor can’t ever seem to quit. Their relationship started back when Thor was also Dr. Blake. Foster was his nurse, but eventually became more than that. Through the years the two would be together and then break up, but they remained very close. To her credit, she also became much more than a love interest. She became a doctor in her own right before taking Thor’s title and hammer from him. It is understandable that Thor seems to always be in her orbit. Her kindness, dedication to others, and unstoppable spirit make her unforgettable."

Accolades 

 In 2017, Screen Rant ranked Jane Foster 3rd in their "15 Best Thors In Marvel Comics" list.
 In 2018, CBR.com ranked Jane Foster 7th in their "Most Iconic Thor Costumes" list and ranked Jane Foster's relationship with Thor 17th in their "20 Historic Marvel Couples" list.
 In 2018, Screen Rant ranked Jane Foster 4th in their "15 Most Powerful Kings And Queens In The Marvel Universe" list, the highest rank for a female character.
 In 2018, Comicbook.com ranked Jane Foster 1st in their "Ranking Every Character to Wield Thor's Hammer" list.
 In 2020, Scary Mommy included Jane Foster in their "195+ Marvel Female Characters Are Truly Heroic" list.
 In 2021, CBR.com ranked Jane Foster 4th in their "20 Most Powerful Female Members Of The Avengers" list, 6th in their "Marvel: The 10 Strongest Female Gods" list, 6th in their "Marvel: The 10 Strongest Female Heroes" list, and 8th in their "10 Strongest Female Marvel Protagonists" list.
 In 2022, Screen Rant ranked Jane Foster 2nd in their "10 Best Thor Costumes From Marvel Comics" list.
 In 2022, The Mary Sue ranked Jane Foster 1st in their "All of Thor’s Love Interests in Marvel Comics" list.
 In 2022, Newsarama ranked Jane foster 24th in their "The best female superheroes" list.
 In 2022, The A.V. Club ranked Jane Foster 66th in their "100 best Marvel characters" list.
 In 2022, Collider included Jane Foster in their "10 Most Powerful Thor Variants From The Movies & Comics" list.
 In 2022, Sideshow ranked Jane Foster 1st in their "Top 10 Marvel Legacy Heroes" list.
 In 2022, CBR.com ranked Jane Foster's Thor costume 5th in their "Thor's 10 Best Costumes In Marvel Comics" list.

Literary reception

Volumes

Thor - 2014 
According to Diamond Comic Distributors, Thor #1 was the 3rd best selling comic book in October 2014. Thor #1 was the 6th best selling comic book in 2014. Thor #5 was the 11th best selling comic book in February 2015. The first five issues of Thor have sold over 100 000 more copies than the previous 2012's Thor: God of Thunder series in March 2015.

Jesse Schedeen of IGN gave Thor #1 a grade of 7.8 out of 10, asserting, "The new volume of Thor faces an uphill battle as it works to escape the shadow of God of Thunder. This first issue doesn't entirely replicate the sense of awesome grandeur of Aaron and Ribic's work and its three-pronged focus on Thor. It's different stylistically, but very much a continuation thematically. Hopefully as the series unfolds, Aaron and Dauterman mesh as storytellers, and we see more of the new female protagonist, this volume of Thor will grow to reach the heights of its predecessor." Chase Magnett of ComicBook.com gave Thor #1 a grade of B+, writing, "The constant in this transition is Jason Aaron. His scripting is as compelling as ever. The first issue of Thor: God of Thunder ended with a very big moment and here he concludes the second issue with two, both of which should leave fans' jaws hanging. There is a hefty amount of exposition to be covered in the beginning of the issue, carrying over from both Original Sin and Thor: God of Thunder. Aaron summarizes the big points with as much grace as possible and focuses on the story at hand. Thor #1 continues Aaron's central themes from the previous series, primarily focusing on the concept of worthiness. It is in the title of the issue itself: "If He Be Worthy". Throughout the early exposition, various figures ponder the fate of Mjolnir and question why no one is able to lift the hammer. These questions form the central conflict of the story. The monstrous antagonists of the first few pages are not nearly as great of a challenge to Thor as his inability to list Mjolnir is. Where Aaron and his collaborators go from here will prove interesting. They have crafted a conflict that has the potential to reflect upon gender politics, redemption, and self-worth. Thor has a long way to go in providing answers and a thesis for these ideas. Together, Dauterman, Wilson, and Aaron have crafted a first issue that ought to compel fans of Thor: God of Thunder to stick around and encourage others to try the new series. Thor #1 is a beautiful debut that contains all of the thunder and power of Marvel's mightiest hero."

The Mighty Thor - 2015 
According to Diamond Comic Distributors, The Mighty Thor #1 was the 12th best selling comic book in November 2015.

Marykate Jasper of CBR.com called The Mighty Thor #1 a "fine first issue," writing, "Speaking of motive, the clever conceit of "The Mighty Thor" #1 -- that Jane must endanger her mortal body in order to assume her godly one -- also creates a very strong character moment that speaks to what makes this Thor unique. To Jane, her power as an individual, mortal doctor is obviously equal to that of a goddess of Thunder. Unfortunately, Aaron also utilizes the more regressive politics of traditional fantasy: democracy is impotent, words are nothing next to force and every character's evil or good intentions can be easily inferred from their world of origin. With so many wonderful, interesting shakeups in this issue, I'd have loved to see a little shift in worldview to go with it. Still, as a whole, "The Mighty Thor" #1 is a wonderful opener. I'm always happy to see Aaron on an Asgard book; he has a great sense of Thor's world and what makes it work, and Dauterman and Wilson's art shows that same understanding of what's so cool about the Ten Realms. "Mighty Thor" is off to an excellent start." Jesse Schedeen of IGN gave The Mighty Thor #1 a grade of 9 out of 10, saying, "As with much of Aaron's work, there's a fair amount of humor to balance out the more dramatic elements. In this case the humor is of the darker variety, mostly centering around how terrible Roxxon and its master are. Roxxon is basically an indictment of greedy energy corporations, crooked politicians and vapid, fear-mongering newscasters all rolled into one. It adds a fun element of satire to the book that, again, helps keep things grounded ever so slightly amid all the spectacle and grandeur. Not that the book doesn't deliver plenty when it comes to spectacle and grandeur. Russell Dauterman proves once again why he's one of Marvel's best acquisitions in recent years. With his graceful line-work and sweeping, epic shots, it's easy to fool yourself into thinking that Olivier Coipel has started drawing Thor again. Dauterman brings his own brand of charm to the book, though. His style is perfectly suited to the dual nature of the book. He captures all the scope and majesty of Asgardia and its inhabitants, but his work is equally great at subtle emotion. The reader can't help but feel the intense pain and suffering Jane experiences as she undergoes her chemotherapy - it's written on every line and crease of her face. Dauterman has already grown significantly since his early Thor issues, so it'll be fun to see just how much his style continues to evolve as this new series gets underway. Thor is the last character that need sprucing up for the All-New, All-Different Marvel relaunch, so it's nice to see that Marvel didn't attempt to fix what wasn't broken. This issue offers an easy gateway into Aaron's ongoing saga, but it also dives right into the myriad conflicts that were left dangling prior to Secret Wars. Even in this first issue, this is a series that captures both the epic scope and intimate drama that make a good Thor comic."

Valkyrie: Jane Foster - 2019 
According to Diamond Comic Distributors, Valkyrie: Jane Foster #1 was the 39th best selling comic book in July 2019.

Karen O'brien of CBR.com described Valkyrie: Jane Foster #1 as "the culmination of writer Jason Aaron’s multi-year reimagination of the plucky doctor as a hero," asserting, "Valkyrie: Jane Foster #1 is a worthy successor to Jane Foster’s tenure as the god of thunder. The inventive creative team has set into motion multiple complex conflicts that will test her new abilities and responsibilities both as a Valkyrie and as a doctor. While an enjoyable debut for longtime fans of Aaron’s work with the character, it’s also a great jumping-on point for new readers." Kate Kosturski of WomenWriteAboutComics stated, "Valkyrie: Jane Foster #1 presumes you read the War of the Realms event. You can certainly jump on with this series without having that knowledge, but reading (or re-reading) the event will provide a second layer of context to Jane’s existential struggle between her two worlds. I do wish this title had the touch of a female writer to lend a feminine perspective. But we do have Jason Aaron, a man who knows Jane Foster (The Mighty Thor) inside and out. Our Jane is in good hands." Cass Clarke of SlashFilm included the Valkyrie: Jane Foster comic book series in their "14 Best Marvel Comics That Love & Thunder Fans Will Want To Read" list, saying, "What works best about this new direction for Jane Foster is how the creative team seamlessly blends her medical knowledge with her cosmic duties. Whether or not she's serving as a Valkyrie, Jane always acts with compassion, providing the best care she can. Her journey to accept that some deaths are unpreventable is compelling to watch, especially as she adjusts to her new job of being a ferryman for departed souls."

Jane Foster & The Mighty Thor - 2022 
According to Diamond Comic Distributors, Jane Foster & The Mighty Thor #1 was the 7th best selling comic book in June 2022.

Caitlin Chappell of CBR.com called Jane Foster & The Mighty Thor #1 a "promising future for fans of Valkyrie," writing, "For the most part, Sabino stylistically distinguishes the characters' inner monologues, but there are a couple of moments where the reader may wonder who's talking. However, when an Asgardian, or Jane, in one of her heroic personas, talks, Sabino makes a subtle but appreciated font change to make it look more ancient, helping to give credence to the almost Shakespearean way many of the Asgardians speak. It's a clever way to establish an accent without spelling things out phonetically or distracting from the proceedings. This exposition-heavy issue doesn't give either of the Thors many opportunities to leap into action, but that will likely change in Issue #2, as a team-up between Jane and Thor seems to be on the horizon. It will also be exciting to see more of Dowling's art in action, as the close-up facial expressions of characters are realistic yet soft, giving many characters a regal feel to them. On top of that, Aburtov's colors play with lightning and shadow to give these characters a glow about them, especially toward the second half of the issue. Overall, readers will have to wait for the meat of Jane Foster & The Mighty Thor, but if they can get through the dense exposition in this first issue, they're sure to enjoy the epic team-up that's on its way." Jim Dandeneau of Den of Geek included the Jane Foster & The Mighty Thor comic book series in their "Best Thor Comics to Grab For Love & Thunder" list. Cass Clarke of SlashFilm included the Jane Foster & The Mighty Thor comic book series in their "14 Best Marvel Comics That Love & Thunder Fans Will Want To Read" list.

Other versions

Marvel 1985
In Marvel 1985 #6 (2008), Jane Foster is the attending nurse present when Jerry Goodman wakes from his coma. He asks her on a date, and she accepts. Jerry has had a crush on Jane since reading Thor comics as a child.

Secret Wars: Thors
In the Secret Wars: Thors miniseries, after various alternate Earths are merged into Battleworld, the various alternate Thors are recruited to police the resulting zones. During their activities, they find themselves investigating the strange deaths of at least six women from different zones, all killed in such a manner as to make identification impossible. With his last act, after being murdered by an unknown assailant, Beta Ray Bill identifies the victims as Jane Foster. The Thors' subsequent investigation- including analysing samples taken from a Jane who died of cancer a few months before the other murders- confirm that the victims are all Janes, but they are unable to track down any living version of her, apart from learning that 'Thor the Unworthy' - the Earth-616 Thor who lost possession of Mjolnir - is interfering in attempts to find her. After interrogating Loki as a witness, the Ultimate Thor learns that the Janes are being murdered by Rune Thor and Destroyer Thor because they looked the Janes in the eyes and saw how far they had fallen from what they could be. The Thors are subsequently rallied to oppose Doom by the Jane Foster of Earth-616 - currently Thor and one of the few survivors of the Incursions - while Rune Thor is rendered unworthy as Jane forces him to acknowledge the truth about his actions.

Thor: The Mighty Avenger
In this all-ages "non-continuity" comic published in 2010 and 2011, Jane Foster is the newly promoted head of the department of Nordic Antiquities at the Bergen War Memorial Museum in Bergen, Oklahoma. She first encounters Thor when he attempts to smash one of the museum's exhibit cases (which is later revealed to contain an urn inside which Thor's hammer is concealed). Over the course of the title's eight issues Jane and Thor (who has been exiled from Asgard by Odin and is staying at Jane's apartment) become romantically involved and have a variety of adventures together.

Ultimate Marvel
Jane briefly appears in the Ultimate Marvel imprint during the first series of Ultimates, where she was a member of an anarchist cult who believed Thorlief Golmen was the genuine god of thunder. She was also described as a nurse from San Francisco. In later events, it seems she and Thor live in a flat together.

What If?
In What If? #10 (Aug. 1978) titled "What If Jane Foster Had Found the Hammer of Thor", Jane assumes Donald Blake's place in finding Mjolnir and is imbued with Thor's powers. Calling herself Thordis, she used her powers to rescue Donald Blake from danger. Upon saving Asgard from Ragnarok, Odin forces her to relinquish the hammer to Donald Blake so he can become the new Thor. This resulted in Jane losing her powers, but she was allowed to remain on Asgard and keep her goddess status since she later falls in love with and marries Thor.

In What If? #25 (Feb. 1980), titled "What If Thor Fought Odin over Jane Foster" (also known as "What If Thor Fought the Asgardian Gods"), Thor is banished from Asgard along with Jane when Thor refused to accept Odin's judgment following Jane's failure to ascend to godhood. Thor subsequently leads the Avengers against the forces of Asgard, leaving Iron Man and Loki (who once again attempted to seize rulership of Asgard during the conflict) dead and forcing Thor himself into self-imposed banishment for almost destroying Asgard in his selfishness.

King Thor
In King Thor's future timeline, Thor with the help of his three granddaughters recreated the Human race with the two first human beings named Steve and Jane. Unlike the ancient humans, they possessed longevity. However, when the time had come for Jane, King Thor offered Jane eternal life, but she refused, because she wanted to be reunited with her love, Steve, in the afterlife.

In other media

Television
 Jane Foster appears in "The Mighty Thor" segment of The Marvel Super Heroes, voiced by Vita Linder.
 Jane Foster appears in The Avengers: Earth's Mightiest Heroes, voiced by Kari Wahlgren. This version is a paramedic.
 Jane Foster and her Thor form appear in Avengers Assemble, voiced by Erica Lindbeck. This version is a cross-dimensional research intern. After the Avengers are scattered across time and space by the Cabal, Foster helps the New Avengers reunite them. After both groups become involved in the Beyonder's Battleworld, Foster helps destroy it before receiving an enchanted mace and the name Thunderstrike.

Marvel Cinematic Universe

Natalie Portman portrays Jane Foster in media set in the Marvel Cinematic Universe (MCU). She makes her first appearance in the live-action film Thor (2011) before making subsequent appearances in the live-action films Thor: The Dark World (2013) and Thor: Love and Thunder (2022), in which she becomes the Mighty Thor. Additionally, alternate timeline versions of Foster appear in the live-action film Avengers: Endgame (2019) and the animated Disney+ series What If...? (2021).

Video games
 Jane Foster and her Thor form appear as unlockable playable characters in Lego Marvel's Avengers, voiced by Elizabeth Maxwell.
 The Jane Foster incarnation of Thor appears as an unlockable playable character in Marvel Contest of Champions.
 The Jane Foster incarnation of Thor appears as an unlockable playable character in Marvel Future Fight.
 The Jane Foster incarnation of Thor appears as an alternate costume for Thor Odinson in Marvel Heroes, voiced by Jennifer Hale.
 The Jane Foster incarnation of Thor appears as an unlockable playable character in Marvel Avengers Alliance.
 The Jane Foster incarnation of Thor appears as an unlockable playable character in Marvel Puzzle Quest.
 The Jane Foster incarnation of Thor appears as an unlockable playable character in Marvel Avengers Academy, voiced by Marissa Lenti.
 The Jane Foster incarnation of Thor appears as an unlockable playable character in Lego Marvel Super Heroes 2.
 The Jane Foster incarnation of Thor appears as an unlockable playable character in Marvel Strike Force.
 The Jane Foster incarnation of Thor appears as a playable DLC character in Marvel's Avengers, voiced by Zehra Fazal. This version hails from an alternate timeline where she was diagnosed with terminal cancer following A-Day, became the new Thor after the original lost his arm in combat and let Mjolnir choose her to succeed him, and joined her timeline's Avengers before being transported to the "prime" universe due to Monica Rappaccini's work with tachyon particles affecting Foster's timeline. Additionally, the "prime" Foster is stated to be healthy as she was not present during her version of A-Day.
 The Jane Foster incarnation of Thor appears in Marvel Snap.

See also

References

Further reading
 "Jane Foster" in Official Handbook of the Marvel Universe Update '89 #3.

External links
 
 

Avengers (comics) characters
Characters created by Jack Kirby
Characters created by Larry Lieber
Characters created by Stan Lee
Comics characters introduced in 1962
Female characters in film
Fictional characters with electric or magnetic abilities
Fictional characters with superhuman durability or invulnerability
Fictional American nurses
Fictional American physicians
Fictional characters with cancer
Fictional characters with weather abilities
Fictional female doctors
Fictional goddesses
Fictional female scientists
Fictional hammer fighters
Female soldier and warrior characters in comics
Thor (Marvel Comics)
Marvel Comics American superheroes
Marvel Comics characters who are shapeshifters
Marvel Comics characters who can move at superhuman speeds
Marvel Comics characters who use magic
Marvel Comics characters with superhuman strength
Marvel Comics female superheroes
Marvel Comics film characters
Marvel Comics scientists